Samuel Colville Lind (June 15, 1879 – February 12, 1965) was a radiation chemist, referred to as "the father of modern radiation chemistry". 

He gained his B.A in 1899 at Washington and Lee University, Lexington, Virginia. After a short spell at MIT he moved to study Chemistry at Leipzig University in Germany, carrying out research into the kinetics of chemical reactions, where he was awarded a Ph.D in 1905. He then returned to work at the University of Michigan until 1913, studying the chemical reactions induced by ionizing radiation. From 1913 to 1925 he worked at the US Bureau of Mines, concerned with extraction of radium from carnotite ore. He subsequently studied the chemical effects of radiation, including on diamonds, and was appointed Chief Chemist of the bureau in 1923. He continued the radiation studies at the Fixed Nitrogen Research Laboratory of the Department of Agriculture (1925–26) and the University of Minnesota (1926–1947) as head of its School of Chemistry. He spent his last few working years as acting director of the chemistry division at Oak Ridge National Laboratory studying the radiation chemistry of gases.

He was inducted a Fellow of the American Physical Society in 1927  and elected a member of the United States National Academy of Sciences in 1930.  He served as president of the American Electrochemical Society in 1927 and the American Chemical Society in 1940.  Among his awards was the Ira Remsen Award in 1947, and the Priestley Medal in 1952.

Private life
He married Marie Holladay of Omaha, Nebraska in 1915.

References 

1879 births
1965 deaths
People from McMinnville, Tennessee
Washington and Lee University alumni
Massachusetts Institute of Technology alumni
Leipzig University alumni
American chemists
Fellows of the American Physical Society
Members of the United States National Academy of Sciences
University of Michigan faculty
Presidents of the Electrochemical Society